Jody Gormley is a former Gaelic footballer who played for the Tyrone and London county teams. He also played a coaching role for Down following his retirement from inter-county play, and has held the role of Antrim football manager. Gormley can now be found managing the Loughinisland club in Co. Down.

Playing career

Tyrone
His career peak was probably in 1995, when Tyrone won the Ulster Championship, and went on end up runner-up in the All-Ireland Final. For Gormley, who was an ever-present throughout the Championship, memorable moments include scoring the winning point in a scorching Ulster Semi-Final against neighbouring rivals, Derry. This win was notable because the Tyrone team had two players sent off, and were 0-8 to 0-5 down at half time.
In the 1995 All-Ireland Senior Football Championship Final, Tyrone lost to Dublin by a point (Dublin 1-10, Tyrone 0-12). Gormley was only Tyrone player to score in that match, apart from an 11-point masterclass by Peter Canavan.

The following year, Tyrone again won the Ulster Championship, but were beaten in All-Ireland Semi Final by Meath. Gormley was one of several Tyrone players injured in that match, which many Tyrone fans attributed to Meath's heavy-handed tactics.

London
Tyrone's fortunes faded following this, and Gormley's job brought him to London. There he joined the London county team, but they rarely performed well in the Championship.

Clubs 
In 2006, Jody played midfield on the Bredagh Senior team that won the Down Junior Football Championship Final, defeating Teconnaught 1-8 to 0-5 in Downpatrick. They proceeded to hammer Drum of Derry in the Quarter Final Of The Ulster Junior Championship in Newcastle, County Down but lost to Noamh Brid of Donegal in the Semi at Breffni Park, Cavan.

Management

Gormley started his inter-county management career with Down. After a promising start to the 2006 National League, Down's challenge tailed off, and they were disappointing in the 2006 Ulster Senior Football Championship, and were knocked out of the qualifiers by Sligo, after which, Gormley stepped down.

Now plying his trade as a teacher, Gormley coached Abbey CBS, Newry to their first MacRory Cup final in nineteen years, which they won. The team also went on to win the All-Ireland colleges championship, the Hogan Cup.

Gormley successfully applied to take over the Antrim management for the 2007 All-Ireland Senior Football Championship, a role he held for two seasons.

Gormley has since moved back into club management, with Longstone, where he took over at the beginning of the 2010 season. Gormley kept the club in the top flight after winning a relegation play-off at the end of the season.

References

External links
 short biography from March 2006
 Website with match reports of Bredagh's run

Year of birth missing (living people)
Living people
Gaelic football managers
Tyrone inter-county Gaelic footballers
London inter-county Gaelic footballers
Tír Chonaill Gaels Gaelic footballers